Denis Defforey (7 July 1925 - 6 February 2006) was a French businessman. He was the co-founder of Carrefour, and its chief executive officer from 1985 to 1990.

References

1925 births
2006 deaths
People from Lagnieu
French chief executives
French company founders
Carrefour people